Hayajan (هيجان) is an Arabic independent Rock and Pop band formed in 2011. The group launched their first album Ya Bay in May 2013, and their second album Khusouf Al-Ard in 2019.

Band members 
 Alaa Wardi – lead vocals, keyboards
 Odai Shawagfeh – electric guitar
 Mohammed Idrei – electric guitar
 Amjad Shahrour – bass
 Hakam Abu Soud – drums

Discography

References 

Indie rock groups
Jordanian rock music groups